The Conversion of Mary Magdalene is an oil painting, an early work by the Italian Renaissance artist based in Venice, Paolo Veronese (1528–1588). He was known for his sumptuous paintings with a dramatic and colourful style. Dating from circa 1545–1548, the painting was commissioned by a noble patron in Verona.  It is held by the National Gallery in London.

Subject
The subject of the painting has been debated: the general opinion is that it depicts the  conversion of Mary Magdalene, as described in Pietro Aretino's 1535 book L'umanità di Cristo; this version of the Gospels was widely distributed and read in Northern Italy at this time. In the legend that inspired the painting, Mary went to a temple where the teachings of Jesus inspired her to convert to a pious life. In the painting she is depicted in dress inappropriate for the religious building, which Veronese used to symbolise her prior sinful life. She is shown on her knees and blushing as she listens to Jesus.

Painting
The scene that the painting depicts is an event that is not described in the  Bible or the Golden Legend. Martha and Mary Magdalene are in the Temple where Jesus is preaching. Mary Magdalene is on her knees beside Christ, turning her face towards him, while Martha is extending her hands towards Christ and Mary Magdalene.  Her low-cut dress alludes to her former life of sin, and the necklace slipping from her neck echoes her turn away from a worldly life towards one of spiritual devotion.

Paolo Veronese was known for his depictions of luxurious settings and love of decorating the most holy and sacred of scenes with people clad in shimmering fur-lined gowns made of silks and brocades, more reminiscent of Venetian high society than humble representations of the subjects. When the Inquisition questioned his choice of representing holy subjects he answered: "We painters take liberties, the same way that poets and lunatics do", thus asserting that his liberty as an artist included being able to choose how to portray his subjects.

The painting has been held by the National Gallery in London since 1876, when it was bequeathed from the estate of art collector Wynn (or Wynne) Ellis.

See also
 Allegory of Virtue and Vice (Veronese)

References

Further reading
Rosand, David, Painting in Sixteenth-Century Venice: Titian, Veronese, Tintoretto, 2nd ed 1997, Cambridge UP 

1554 paintings
Renaissance paintings
Paintings by Paolo Veronese
Collections of the National Gallery, London
Paintings depicting Jesus
Paintings depicting Mary Magdalene